Thomas Smythe (9 April 1825, Ipswich – 15 May 1906, Ipswich) was an artist who painted landscapes, bucolic scenes and animals. He exhibited seventeen paintings with the Society of British Artists and was an active member of the Ipswich Fine Art Club from 1878 to 1903.

Early life
He was born the son of James Smyth (1780-1863) and his Sarah Harriet (née Skitter). He was brought up in Berners Street, Ipswich with his brother, Edward Robert Smythe (1810-1899), also an artist.

References

1825 births
1906 deaths
19th-century English artists
19th-century English painters